Tasman Rugby Boadilla is a Spanish rugby team based in Boadilla del Monte.

History
The club was established in 2001.

Season to season

1 seasons in División de Honor B

External links
Official website

Spanish rugby union teams
Rugby clubs established in 2001
Boadilla del Monte
Sports teams in the Community of Madrid